The 2013–14 Algerian Cup was the 50th edition of the Algerian Cup. The winners were MC Alger who qualified for the 2015 CAF Confederation Cup.

Round of 64
The round of 64 is the first national round of the Algerian Cup. On November 26, 2013, the draw for the rounds of 64 and 32 were held at a ceremony at the Sheraton Hotel in Algiers.

Round of 32
The round of 32 was held on 21 and 22 December 2013.

Round of 16
The draw for the round of 16 was held on January 8.

Quarter-finals

Semi-finals

Final

Match

References

Algerian Cup
Algerian Cup
Algerian Cup